"Kaun Tujhe" ( Who Would) is a Hindi song from the soundtrack of the 2016 Hindi Film,  M.S. Dhoni: The Untold Story. The song was penned by Manoj Muntashir, composed by Amaal Mallik, sung by Palak Muchhal (who earlier sang songs like "Baatein Ye Kabhi Na", "Chahun Mein Yaa Naa" etc.) and parranged - produced by Meghdeep Bose. The song is featured in the film in a scene involving Sushant Singh Rajput and Disha Patani.

Release
"Kaun Tujhe" was released on 28 August 2016.

Reception
Box Office Collection India described the song as "very beautiful" and singer Palak Muchchal as "melodious". It rated the song 4.3 out of 5 stars. In its review it rates the lyrics and singing as "Excellent" and the music as "Very Good".

India Today wrote: "Kaun Tujhe is the female version of the typical Armaan Malik romantic song - which are essentially paeans for the lover, who is exclusive, one in a million. Once again, the song is a winner because of the simplicity of its composition, singing, lyrics, and arrangement, which is not intrusive. Amaal Mallik lets his music breathe and take its time to come to its own in this film and that is a great quality."

Times of India wrote: "'Kaun Tujhe' tells the love story of MS Dhoni and his late girlfriend, Priyanka Jha. The song shows how the couple enjoyed simple joys of life such as a stroll in a market wherein Dhoni walked with a helmet on to avoid catching attention, highlighting the struggles of celebrities with the paparazzi. Dhoni's ladylove died in a tragic accident in 2002 when the successful innings of Indian skipper had just begun."

India Today says : "Kaun Tujhe is the female version of the typical 'Armaan Malik romantic song' - which are essentially paeans for the lover, who is exclusive, one-in-a-million, etcetra, etcetra. Once again, the song is a winner because of the simplicity of its composition, singing, lyrics, and arrangement, which is not intrusive. Amaal Mallik lets his music breathe and take its time to come to its own in this film and that is a great quality."

Daily News and Analysis wrote: "The song 'Kaun Tujhe' has been penned by Manoj Muntashir and composed by Amaal Mallik. Palak Muchhal has lent her soulful voice to make it even more melodious. The song has been picturised very beautifully, portraying Sushant and Disha's light hearted romantic moments while the lyrics aptly form the backdrop of their love story."

Emma Heesters recreated a cover of the song in English and uploaded it on 25 September 2020 on her YouTube channel. T-Series requested YouTube on 8 October to remove the cover for copyright reasons. It had then received already 3.5 million views. YouTube removed it on the same day together with 2 other T-Series Hindi cinema covers in English by Emma ("Tuhje Kitna Cahne Lage" - 5 million views and "Malang" - 1.2 million views; later on it removed the cover of "Khayriat" on the day of release). This is very unusual with respect to covers on YouTube (e.g. Sony Music India took no comparable action to the astonishing cover of Emma of "Shayad"). The action of T-Series caused a general worldwide protest by, inter alia, subscribers of the channel of Emma (then nearly 3 million).

Accolades

References

2016 songs
Songs written for films
Hindi film songs
Palak Muchhal songs
Songs with music by Amaal Mallik
Songs with lyrics by Manoj Muntashir